Aynalem Eshetu Shefrawe (born 5 February 1992) is an Ethiopian race walker. She has won multiple medals on a continental level.

She currently holds several national records at various distances.

Competition record

Personal bests
5000 metres walk – 24:13.29 (Bressanone 2009)
10,000 metres walk – 49:00.6 (Addis Ababa 2011)
20 kilometres walk – 1:39:49 (Brazzaville 2015)

References

1992 births
Living people
Ethiopian female racewalkers
African Games medalists in athletics (track and field)
African Games bronze medalists for Ethiopia
African Games silver medalists for Ethiopia
Athletes (track and field) at the 2015 African Games
Athletes (track and field) at the 2019 African Games
21st-century Ethiopian women